Norbert Wollheim (April 26, 1913 – November 1, 1998) was a chartered accountant, tax advisor, previously a board member of the Central Council of Jews in Germany and a functionary of other Jewish organisations.

Wollheim grew up in Berlin. He studied jurisprudence and political economy, but had to cease his studies in 1933 because of his Jewish origin. He then worked as a welder for a metal export firm until the outbreak of war in 1938. During that same period he played a key role in running the Kindertransport which transported 10,000 Jewish children out of the Nazi's reach and into safety.

In 1939, he also personally accompanied Kindertransports to Sweden, but immediately returned to Berlin after leaving the children in safety. Until 1941 he was responsible for the vocational training schools of the Reichsvereinigung der Juden in Deutschland and adviser on the training relating to crafts of Jewish Germans.

From September 1941 Wollheim worked at a transportation equipment factory in Lichtenberg, Berlin.

Auschwitz

 
On March 12, 1943, the whole family was deported to Auschwitz. While Wollheim was singled out for slave labour, his sister, wife and child were gassed in the concentration camp.

Wollheim was brought to Auschwitz camp III, Monowitz, where he had to work as a slave labourer for I.G. Farbenindustrie AG, helping build the new Buna-factory IV until the evacuation of Auschwitz on January 18, 1945. On one of the so-called death marches of camp inmates being evacuated by the SS, Wollheim managed to flee.

After the war

He settled in Lübeck, British Zone of Occupation. He soon engaged in the Lübeck Jewish community, elected its president, and helped to rebuild Jewish life in West Germany. He was elected second chairman of the Central Committee of Liberated Jews in the British Zone ("") and was cofounder of the Jewish Trust Corporation in the British zone. Later he became chairman of the Association of Northwestern Germany's Jewish Congregations and member of the board of the Central Council of Jews in Germany.

I.G. Farben claim

In 1950 Norbert Wollheim sued I.G. Farbenindustrie AG in liquidation for his salary as a forced labourer and compensation for damages. His lawsuit was the first test case of a former forced labourer against a company in Germany. In 1953, Frankfurt's Landgericht convicted IG Farben i.L. and ordered them to pay, at the first hearing, DM 10,000 in punitive damages to Wollheim. At the second hearing, Frankfurt's Oberlandesgericht settled the lawsuit with a global settlement awarding several thousand of the former slave labourers of I.G. Farben DM 30 million. The settlement apart from the parties of the lawsuit involved the Conference on Jewish Material Claims against Germany. The settlement was accompanied by a law in 1957 passed by the West German Bundestag.

Wollheim emigrated to the U.S. in September 1951 and settled in New York City, where he studied to become an accountant. He exercised his profession until the mid-1980s. Wollheim provided his services on a pro bono basis to organisations like the US Holocaust Council and the World Federation of Bergen-Belsen Survivors.

References

 Wollheim, Norbert: "Belsen’s Place in the Process of „Death-and-Rebirth“ of the Jewish People", in: Irgun She'erit Hapleita Me'ha'ezor Habriti, Belsen: London: The Narod Press, 1957, pp. 52–66.
 Norbert Wollheim Memorial: 
 Rudberg, Pontus, The Swedish Jews and the Holocaust, Abingdon & New York, 2017, pp.  136–137 
 Wollheim, Norbert, "Wir haben Stellung bezogen", in: Richard Chaim Schneider, Wir sind da! Die Geschichte der Juden in Deutschland von 1945 bis heute, Berlin: Ullstein, 2000, pp. 108–120
 Wollheim, Norbert, "Jüdische Selbstverwaltung in der britischen Zone", in: Michael Brenner, Nach dem Holocaust: Juden in Deutschland 1945-1950, Munich: Beck, 1995, pp. 141–147
 Benz, Wolfgang, Wiedergutmachung in der Bundesrepublik Deutschland, Munich: R. Oldenbourg, 1989, (=Schriftenreihe der Vierteljahrshefte für Zeitgeschichte Sondernummer), pp. 303–326

External links

 Norbert Wollheim papers and Benjamin B. Ferencz collection on the trial against I.G. Farbenindustrie AG i.L.
 Henry Ormond papers on the trial against I.G. Farbenindustrie AG i.L.
 Norbert Wollheim Memorial Website
 Link to information about the Academy Award-winning documentary in which Norbert Wollheim is featured, "Into the Arms of Strangers: Stories of the Kindertransport" (2000) 
 Link to free downloadable companion study guide for "Into the Arms of Strangers: Stories of the Kindertransport" (2000)

1913 births
1998 deaths
20th-century German Jews
German emigrants to the United States
Auschwitz concentration camp survivors
German accountants
People from Berlin
People from the Kingdom of Prussia